Viva la Revolution is the third full-length album by Dragon Ash, released in 1999. It is the first full-length album after Dragon Ash member DJ BOTS formally joined, creating the new hip hop/rock amalgamation sound for which they have since become known. It has been described as "the album where Kenji's polyphagia has been expressed best."

The song "Communication" is a new version of "I Love Hip Hop" with a different backing track and vocals to avoid copyright infringement of "I Love Rock 'n' Roll."

Track listing
"Intro" – 0:52 
"Communication" – 3:28
"Rock the Beat" – 3:26
"Humanity (Album Version)" – 2:58
"Attention" – 3:30
"Let Yourself Go, Let Myself Go" – 5:05
"Dark Cherries" – 4:01
"Drugs Can't Kill Teens" – 4:34
"Just I'll Say" –  3:17 
"Fool Around" – 2:04 
"Freedom of Expression" – 4:07 
"Nouvelle Vague #2" – 2:35 
"Viva la Revolution" – 5:00
"Grateful Days" – 4:49
"Outro" – 1:04
"Hot Cake" (hidden track) – 4:01

Samples
"Communication"
"Romeo and Juliet Break" & "Scratch Sentence One" from Super Duck Breaks by DJ Babu
"Flash It to the Beat" by Flash & Furious 5
"I'm Chief Kamanawanalea (We're the Royal Macadamia Nuts)" by The Turtles

"Rock the Beat"
"I Can't Live Without My Radio" by LL Cool J
"Kick & Loud" by Geisha Girls

"Attention"
"Entropy" by DJ Shadow & The Groove Rubbers
"That's the Joint" by Funky Four Plus One

"Dark Cherries"
"Breakthrough" by Isaac Hayes

"Viva la Revolution"
"Viva" by Tin Star

"Grateful Days"
"Today" by Smashing Pumpkins

References

Dragon Ash albums
1999 albums
Victor Entertainment albums